Fernando Sorrentino (born November 8, 1942) is an Argentine writer. His works have been translated into English, Portuguese, Italian, German, French, Finnish, Hungarian, Polish, Bulgarian, Chinese, Vietnamese, Tamil, Kannada, Persian and Kabyle.

Sorrentino was born in Buenos Aires.
In 2006 Fernando Sorrentino published a collection of short stories entitled: "Per colpa del dottor Moreau ed altri racconti fantastici".
The collection includes all his short stories translated in Italian and is published by Progetto Babele literary magazine. The same literary magazine published a new collection in 2013: "Per difendersi dagli scorpioni ed altri racconti insoliti".

Short stories
La regresión zoológica, Buenos Aires, Editores Dos, 1969, 154 págs.
Imperios y servidumbres, Barcelona, Editorial Seix Barral, 1972, 196 págs.; reedición, Buenos Aires, Torres Agüero Editor, 1992, 160 págs.
El mejor de los mundos posibles, Buenos Aires, Editorial Plus Ultra, 1976, 208 págs.
En defensa propia, Buenos Aires, Editorial de Belgrano, 1982, 128 págs.
El rigor de las desdichas, Buenos Aires, Ediciones del Dock, 1994, 82 págs.
La Corrección de los Corderos, y otros cuentos improbables, Buenos Aires, Editorial Abismo, 2002, 194 págs.
Existe un hombre que tiene la costumbre de pegarme con un paraguas en la cabeza, Barcelona, Ediciones Carena, 2005, 356 págs.
El regreso. Y otros cuentos inquietantes, Buenos Aires, Editorial Estrada, 2005, 80 págs.
En defensa propia / El rigor de las desdichas, Buenos Aires, Editorial Los Cuadernos de Odiseo, 2005, 144 págs.
Biblioteca Mínima de Opinión, Santa Cruz de la Sierra, Editora Opinión, 2007, 32 págs.
Costumbres del alcaucil, Buenos Aires, Editorial Sudamericana, 2008, 64 págs.
El crimen de san Alberto, Buenos Aires, Editorial Losada, 2008, 186 págs.
El centro de la telaraña, y otros cuentos de crimen y misterio, Buenos Aires, Editorial Longseller, 2008, 64 págs. Nueva edición: El centro de la telaraña, y otros cuentos de crimen y misterio, Buenos Aires, Editorial Longseller, 2014, 96 págs.
Paraguas, supersticiones y cocodrilos (Verídicas historias improbables), Veracruz (México), Instituto Literario de Veracruz, El Rinoceronte de Beatriz, 2013, 140 págs.
Problema resuelto / Problem gelöst, edición bilingüe español/alemán, Düsseldorf, DUP (Düsseldorf University Press), 2014, 252 págs.
Los reyes de la fiesta, y otros cuentos con cierto humor, Madrid, Apache Libros, 2015, 206 págs.

Children and teenagers' literature
Cuentos del Mentiroso, Buenos Aires, Editorial Plus Ultra, 1978, 96 págs. (Faja de Honor de la S.A.D.E. [Sociedad Argentina de Escritores]); reedición (con modificaciones), Buenos Aires, Grupo Editorial Norma, 2002, 140 págs.; nueva reedición (con nuevas modificaciones), Buenos Aires, Cántaro, 2012, 176 págs.
El remedio para el rey ciego, Buenos Aires, Editorial Plus Ultra, 1984, 78 págs.
El Mentiroso entre guapos y compadritos, Buenos Aires, Editorial Plus Ultra, 1994, 96 págs.
La recompensa del príncipe, Buenos Aires, Editorial Stella, 1995, 160 págs.
Historias de María Sapa y Fortunato, Buenos Aires, Editorial Sudamericana, 1995, 72 págs. (Premio Fantasía Infantil 1996); reedición: Ediciones Santillana, 2001, 102 págs.
El Mentiroso contra las Avispas Imperiales, Buenos Aires, Editorial Plus Ultra, 1997, 120 págs.
La venganza del muerto, Buenos Aires, Editorial Alfaguara, 1997, 92 págs.
El que se enoja, pierde, Buenos Aires, Editorial El Ateneo, 1999, 56 págs.
Aventuras del capitán Bancalari, Buenos Aires, Editorial Alfaguara, 1999, 92 págs.
Cuentos de don Jorge Sahlame, Buenos Aires, Ediciones Santillana, 2001, 134 págs.
El Viejo que Todo lo Sabe, Buenos Aires, Ediciones Santillana, 2001, 94 págs.
Burladores burlados, Buenos Aires, Editorial Crecer Creando, 2006, 104 págs.
La venganza del muerto [edición ampliada, contiene cinco cuentos: Historia de María Sapa; Relato de mis travesuras; La fortuna de Fortunato; Hombre de recursos; La venganza del muerto,], Buenos Aires, Editorial Alfaguara, 2011, 160 págs.

Longer Works
Costumbres de los muertos, 1996
Sanitarios centenarios, 1979 [tr. Sanitary Centennial: And Selected Short Stories, 1988]

Nonfiction (Interviews & essays)
Siete conversaciones con Jorge Luis Borges, 1974 [tr. by Clark M. Zlotchew, Seven Conversations With Jorge Luis Borges, 1982, 2010]
Conversaciones con Jorge Luis Borges, 2017
Siete conversaciones con Adolfo Bioy Casares, 1992, 2001, 2007
El forajido sentimental. Incursiones por los escritos de Jorge Luis Borges, 2011

Anthologies
Treinta y cinco cuentos breves argentinos, 1973
Treinta cuentos hispanoamericanos (1875-1975), 1976
Cuentos argentinos de imaginación, 1974
Treinta y seis cuentos argentinos con humor, 1976 
Diecisiete cuentos fantásticos argentinos, 1978.
Nosotros contamos cuentos, 1987
Historias improbables. Antología del cuento insólito argentino, 2007 
Ficcionario argentino (1840-1940). Cien años de narrativa: de Esteban Echeverría a Roberto Arlt, 2012
Cincuenta cuentos clásicos argentinos. De Juan María Gutiérrez  Enrique González Tuñón, 2016

Translations (Fiction)
Sanitary Centennial. And Selected Short Stories. Translated by Thomas C. MEEHAN. Austin, Texas, University of Texas Press, 1988, 186 págs.
Sanitários centenários [Sanitarios centenarios]. Traducción al portugués de Reinaldo GUARANY. Río de Janeiro, José Olympio Editora, 1989, 174 págs. 
Von Skorpionen und anderen Alltagsgefahren. Erzählungen. Ausgewählt und aus dem Spanischen übersetzt von Vera GERLING. Gotinga, Hainholz Verlag, 2001, 160 págs.
Attukkuttikal Allikkum Thandanai (La Corrección de los Corderos). Volumen de once cuentos en lengua tamil. Nagercoil (India), Kalachuvadu Pathippagam, 2003, 72 págs.
Per colpa del dottor Moreau, ed altri racconti fantastici (14 racconti; traduttori: Alessandro ABATE; Mario DE BARTOLOMEIS; Isabel CUARTERO; Carlo SANTULLI, Marco CAPELLI y Eva MALAGON ESTEO; Luca MUZZIOLI). Módena, Progetto Babele, 2006, 100 págs.
Existe um homem que tem o costume de me dar com um guarda-chuva na cabeça (18 contos; traduzidos do espanhol por António LADEIRA e Helder SEMMEDO). Entroncamento (Portugal), OVNI, 2006, 182 págs.
Per difendersi dagli scorpioni, ed altri racconti insoliti (20 racconti; traduttori: Alessandro ABATE; Mario DE BARTOLOMEIS; Federico GUERRINI; Renata LO IACONO; Carlo SANTULLI). Macerata, Progetto Babele / Stampalibri, 2009, 140 págs.
Goftegoo baa Borgess (Siete conversaciones con Jorge Luis Borges [persa]) (2012). Teherán, Morvarid, 2012, 136 págs.
How to Defend Yourself against Scorpions (25 short stories; translators: Clark M. ZLOTCHEW, Emmy BRIGGS, Gustavo ARTILES, Michele MCKAY AYNESWORTH, Alex PATTERSON, Jonathan COLE, Norman Thomas DI GIOVANNI, Susan ASHE, Donald A. YATES, Naomi LINDSTROM). Liverpool, Red Rattle Books, 2013, 216 págs.
Problema resuelto / Problem gelöst (2014). Edición bilingüe español/alemán. Al cuidado de Vera Elisabeth GERLING y Andrea SCHMITTMANN (16 cuentos; traductoras: Francie BOORTZ, Stephanie ZYSK, Emilia GAGALSKI, Sophia HÜBSCHMANN, Verena-Loraine TRZASKOWSKI, Tanja WICHMANN, Hoda ISTAN, Hanna Christine FLIEDNER, Katharina MEYER, Doreen KLAHOLD, Aletta WIECZOREK, Nina SCHÜRMANN, Andrea SCHMITTMANN, Sonia LÓPEZ, Johanna MALCHER, Constanze WEHNES, Anna-Maria ORLACCHIO, Sandra FUERTES ROMERO, Jana WAHRENDORFF). Düsseldorf, DUP (Düsseldorf University Press), 2014, 252 págs.
Dastan haye dorugh-gü [Cuentos del Mentiroso], traducido al persa por Reza ESKANDARY, Teherán, Hoopa, 2016, 159 págs.
Entegham e mordé [La venganza del muerto], traducido al persa por Reza ESKANDARY, Teherán, Hoopa, 2016, 206 págs.
Faribkaran e faribjordé [Burladores burlados], traducido al persa por Saíd MATÍN, Teherán, Hoopa, 2016, 117 págs.
Per colpa del dottor Moreau ed altri racconti fantastici, Italian translation by Alessandro Abate, Marco Roberto Capelli, Carlo Santulli, Mario De Bartolomeis, Isabel Cuartero, Luca Muzzioli, published by Progetto Babele Literary Magazine, 2006, 167 pages.
Per difendersi dagli scorpioni ed altri racconti isoliti, Italian translation by Alessandro Abate, Federico Guerrini, Mario De Bartolomeis, Renata Lo Iacono, published by Progetto Babele Literary Magazine, 2011, 192 pages.
Al tariqa Al Wahida Limukafahat Al Aqarib, wa qisas okhraa ghayr aadia (The Only Method to Combat Scorpions, and other remarkable tales), an anthology of 22 short stories, selected and translated from Spanish to Arabic by Abdallah Altaiyeb, a Saudi author and translator, published by Dar Kalemat, 2021, 174 pages. 
Imbratoriyet Albebaghawat, wa qisas okhraa ghayr aadia (The Empire of the Parakeets, and other remarkable tales), an anthology of 14 short stories, selected and translated from Spanish to Arabic by Abdallah Altaiyeb, a Saudi author and translator, published by Dar Kalemat, 2021, 172 pages.
Jareimett Al Ked'dies Alberto (The Crime of Saint Alberto), a novella, translated from Spanish to Arabic by Abdallah Altaiyeb, a Saudi author and translator, published by Dar Kalemat, 2022, 111 pages.

Translations (Interviews)
Seven Conversations with Jorge Luis Borges [Siete conversaciones con Jorge Luis Borges]. Translation, additional notes, appendix of personalities mentioned by Borges and translator's foreword by Clark M. ZLOTCHEW. Troy, Nueva York, The Whitston Publishing Company, 1982, 220 págs.
Sette conversazioni con Borges [Siete conversaciones con Jorge Luis Borges]. A cura di Lucio D’ARCANGELO. Milán, Arnoldo Mondadori Editore, 1999, 224 págs.
Hét beszélgetés Jorge Luis Borgesszel [Siete conversaciones con Jorge Luis Borges]. Fordította LATORRE Ágnes. Szerkesztette SCHOLZ László. Budapest, Európa Könyvkiadó, 2000, 264 págs. 
Borges chi si tan [Siete conversaciones con Jorge Luis Borges]. Traducción al chino de LIN YI AN. Pekín, Guangming Daily Press, 2000, 212 págs.
Sapte convorbiri cu Jorge Luis Borges [Siete conversaciones con Jorge Luis Borges]. Traducción al rumano de Stefana LUCA. Bucarest, Editura Fabulator, 2004, 200 págs.
Sapte convorbiri cu Adolfo Bioy Casares [Siete conversaciones con Adolfo Bioy Casares]. Traducción al rumano de Ileana SCIPIONE. Bucarest, Editura Fabulator, 2004, 180 págs.
Sete conversas com Jorge Luis Borges [Siete conversaciones con Jorge Luis Borges]. Tradução: Ana FLORES. Río de Janeiro, Azougue Editorial, 2009, 224 págs.
Seven Conversations with Jorge Luis Borges [Siete conversaciones con Jorge Luis Borges]. Translated, with Notes and Appendix by Clark M. ZLOTCHEW. Filadelfia, Paul Dry Books, 2010, 196 págs.
Sedem radsgovora s Jorge Luis Borges [Siete conversaciones con Jorge Luis Borges]. Traducción al búlgaro de Boriana DUKOVA. Sofía, Enthusiast Libris, 2011, 224 págs.
Sette conversazioni con Adolfo Bioy Casares [Siete conversaciones con Adolfo Bioy Casares]. A cura di María José FLORES REQUEJO, Introduzione di Armando FRANCESCONI, Traduzione e note di Armando FRANCESCONI e Laura LISI, Note alla traduzione di Laura LISI. Pescara, Edizioni Solfanelli, 2014, 232 págs. 
Sedam razgovora sa Horheom Luisom Borhesom [Siete conversaciones con Jorge Luis Borges]. Prevod sa španskog: Sandra NEŠOVIĆ. Belgrado, Dereta, 2014, 182 págs.
Sete conversas com Bioy Casares [Siete conversaciones con Adolfo Bioy Casares]. Tradução: Ana FLORES. Guaratinguetá (SP), Editora Penalux, 2017, 220 págs.

References

External links
Sorrentino's homepage
Sorrentino's biography
Sorrentino's website 
Sorrentino's biography in italian, the site presents also some short stories of his
Collection of Sorrentino short stories in English
Sorrentino's short stories in Spanish, English, French and Catalan at Badosa.com

Living people
1942 births